Pedro Pablo Abarca de Bolea y Jiménez de Urrea, 10th Count of Aranda (1718 in Siétamo, Huesca – 1798 in Épila, Saragossa), was a Spanish statesman and diplomat.

Early life
He began ecclesiastical studies in the seminary of Bologna but when he was 18 he changed to the Military School of Parma. In 1740, he was captain in the Spanish Army and fought in the War of the Austrian Succession. As he had been severely wounded in combat in 1743 (he was left for dead on the battlefield), he temporarily left the military and traveled through Europe.  He studied the Prussian Army, later introducing its system of drill into the Spanish army, and lived in Paris, where he met Diderot, Voltaire and D'Alembert and studied the Encyclopédie and Enlightenment movements. He briefly visited London in September 1754.

Due to Prime Minister Ricardo Wall's sponsorship, Ferdinand VI appointed him in 1755 ambassador to Portugal and in 1757 director general  of Artillery, a post that he soon resigned, along with his military rank, because he was forbidden to pursue corrupt  contractors. In 1760, Charles III appointed him ambassador to Poland and on his return he was sent to Portugal to supersede Nicolás de Carvajal, Marquis of Sarria in the command of the Spanish army then invading Portugal. His forces managed to capture the key border town of Almeida but were then forced to retreat following the intervention of British troops led by John Burgoyne at the Battle of Valencia de Alcántara and the war was brought to an end shortly afterwards by the Treaty of Paris.

In 1763 he was appointed captain general of the Province of Valencia. When the Esquilache Riots happened he was appointed captain general  of New Castile and president of the Council of Castile. As he enjoyed the personal confidence of the king, his power was similar to a prime minister's. He promoted many enlightened reforms and he supported the expulsion of the Jesuits in 1767. His political and courtier enemies, especially Floridablanca, managed to achieve his dismissal.  He was appointed ambassador to France in 1773, where he stayed until 1787.

In Paris, analyzing the situation created after the United States won its independence, he drafted a projected Commonwealth for the Spanish Empire: three independent kingdoms (Peru, Tierra Firme (New Granada and Venezuela) and Mexico) with three Spanish infantes in their thrones. The Spanish king would remain as the Spanish Emperor.

Chief Minister

In 1792, he returned to Spain to replace José Moñino, 1st Count of Floridablanca as secretary of State (Prime minister). After the imprisonment of Louis XVI (August, 1792) and the proclamation of the Republic in France (September), Aranda's Enlightenment leanings seemed incompatible with the total war that several European monarchies were about to declare against  revolutionary France.  Aranda was therefore   replaced by Manuel Godoy in November. After the defeat of Spanish Army in Roussillon, Godoy and Aranda publicly quarreled in the Council of State. That same night Aranda was arrested and confined to Jaén. A year later he was indulted and retired to his estates in Aragon.

He was buried in the monastery of San Juan de la Peña.

Family
In 1749 he married Doña Ana, daughter of the 9th duke of Híjar, by whom he had one son, who died young, and a daughter.

See also
 List of prime ministers of Spain

References

Bibliography
Albiac, María Dolores: El conde de Aranda. Los laberintos del poder, Saragossa: Caja de Ahorros de la Inmaculada, 1998
Olaechea, Rafael; Ferrer, José A.: El Conde de Aranda (mitos y realidad de un político aragonés), Saragossa: Librería General, 1978
Téllez Alarcia, Diego: Absolutismo e Ilustración en la España del s. XVIII. El Despotismo Ilustrado de D. Ricardo Wall, Madrid: Fundación Española de Historia Moderna, 2008.

External links
The Penny Cyclopædia of the Society for the Diffusion of Useful Knowledge
Genealogy of the Counts of Aranda (in Spanish)

1718 births
1798 deaths
People from Hoya de Huesca
Ambassadors of Spain to France
Ambassadors of Spain to Poland
Ambassadors of Spain to Portugal
Counts of Spain
Aranda, Count of
Knights of the Golden Fleece of Spain
Spanish captain generals